"What'll We Do with Him Boys? (The Yanks Made a Monkey Out of You)" is a World War I song written by Andrew B. Sterling and composed by Arthur Lange. The song was first published in 1918 by Joe Morris Music Co., in New York City. The sheet music cover depicts a jungle scene with a monkey and a lion with an inset photo of W. J. Reilly.

The sheet music can be found at the Pritzker Military Museum & Library.

References

Bibliography

1918 songs
Songs about soldiers
Songs of World War I
Songs with lyrics by Andrew B. Sterling
Songs with music by Arthur Lange